August Dvorak (May 5, 1894 – October 10, 1975) was an American educational psychologist and professor of education at the University of Washington in Seattle, Washington.  He and his brother-in-law, William Dealey, are best known for creating the Dvorak keyboard layout in the 1930s as a replacement for the QWERTY keyboard layout. In the 1940s, Dvorak designed keyboard layouts for people with the use of one hand.

Dvorak and Dealey, together with Nellie Merrick and Gertrude Ford, wrote the book Typewriting Behavior, published in 1936. The book is an in-depth report on the psychology and physiology of typing.

Dvorak served with the American Army Field Artillery during the punitive expedition against Pancho Villa and was wounded during the campaign. Afterward he was discharged and enlisted in the United States Naval Reserve, teaching mathematics and navigation until World War I, during which he served aboard the captured German privateer USS Callao bringing troops home until his discharge in 1919. Later, he was the captain of a Gato-class submarine in the United States Navy during World War II.  While his name is pronounced , with the ř roughly as a simultaneous trilled  and  due to him being of Czech descent, Dvorak's family in the U.S. pronounces it , with an English r.

Dvorak died in Seattle on October 10, 1975.

References

External links

Photograph: August Dvorak and typing class at University of Washington, Seattle (November 14, 1932)
Dvorak Keyboard Claims
Dvorak Keyboard Magazine
Dvorak keyboard layout, Spanish variant

1894 births
1975 deaths
American people of Czech descent
University of Washington faculty
United States Navy officers
Submariners
People from Glencoe, Minnesota
Military personnel from Minnesota